Northern Nash High School is a high school located in Nash County, west of the Rocky Mount, North Carolina city limits.

History
Northern Nash High School opened in 1966, consolidating the former Nashville High School, Red Oak High School, Benvenue High School and in its second year, Swift Creek High School. As such, it was one of the first integrated schools in Rocky Mount.

Curriculum
Northern Nash offers Cisco Networking Academy courses in its technical education offerings. A dual-enrollment program is offered in which students may enroll in some classes at nearby Nash Community College.

Band program
The band program has many ensembles during both the summer and the school year, including Marching Band, Symphonic Band, Wind Ensemble, Percussion Ensemble, and Winterguard.

Notable alumni
 J. J. Arrington, NFL player
 Luther Barnes, gospel singer
 Roy A. Cooper, Governor of North Carolina
 Billy Godwin, East Carolina University baseball coach
 Terrence J, television personality
 Mike Tyson, former MLB player
 Charles Pittman, former NBA basketball player
 Phil Valentine, syndicated talk show host
 Steven Baker, Former NFL

References

External links
 Official website
 Band website

Educational institutions established in 1965
Public high schools in North Carolina
Schools in Nash County, North Carolina
1965 establishments in North Carolina